The 1918 Camp Gordon football team represented Camp Gordon in Chamblee, Georgia, during the 1918 college football season. The team compiled a 2–3 record. Former Georgia Tech star Everett Strupper played quarterback for Camp Gordon. Red Barron starred in Gordon's loss to Tech.

Schedule

References

Camp Gordon
Camp Gordon football seasons
Camp Gordon football